The Northern Ireland Assembly was a legislative assembly set up by the Government of the United Kingdom on 3 May 1973 to restore devolved government to Northern Ireland with the power-sharing Northern Ireland Executive made up of unionists and nationalists. It was abolished by the Northern Ireland Act 1974.

History
Elections were held on 28 June 1973.  The Northern Ireland Constitution Act 1973, which received the Royal Assent on 18 July 1973, abolished the suspended Parliament of Northern Ireland and the post of Governor and made provision for a devolved administration consisting of an Executive chosen by the Assembly.
108 members were elected by Single Transferable Vote from Northern Ireland's 18 Westminster constituencies, with 5 to 8 seats for each depending on its population.

The Assembly met for the first time on 31 July 1973. Following the Sunningdale Agreement, a power-sharing Executive was established from 1 January 1974. After opposition from within the Ulster Unionist Party (UUP) and the Ulster Workers' Council strike over the proposal of an all Ireland council, the Executive and Assembly collapsed on 28 May 1974 when Brian Faulkner resigned as Chief Executive.

Members of the Northern Ireland Executive (1974)

Legislation passed

The Assembly had powers to pass primary legislation known as Assembly Measures. Four such measures were passed by the assembly:

|-
| {{|Financial Provisions Measure (Northern Ireland) 1974|mnia|2|26-03-1974|maintained=y|archived=n|A Measure to increase the limits on sums which may be issued out of the Consolidated Fund for certain purposes; to authorise the issue of a sum to the Ulster Land Fund; to make further provision with respect to rate rebates; and for purposes connected with those matters.}}
|-
| {{|Electricity and Gas Undertakings (Financial Provisions) Measure (Northern Ireland) 1974|mnia|3|26-03-1974|archived=n|A Measure to make provision for compensating the Northern Ireland Electricity Service and certain gas undertakings in respect of financial loss due to compliance with the national policy relating to limitation of prices or with certain agreements to the like effect and for purposes connected therewith.}}
|-
| {{|National Insurance Measure (Northern Ireland) 1974|mnia|4|21-05-1974|maintained=y|archived=n|A Measure to amend the provisions of the National Insurance Acts (Northern Ireland) 1966 to 1973, the National Insurance (Industrial Injuries) Acts (Northern Ireland) 1966 to 1973 and the Workmen's Compensation (Supplementation) Acts (Northern Ireland) 1966 to 1973 as to the rate or amount of benefit and contributions; to make supplementary provisions, and minor amendments of certain enactments, relating to social security; and for purposes connected with those matters.}}
}}

See also
Northern Ireland Constitution Act 1973
Northern Ireland Executive (1974)
Members of the Northern Ireland Assembly elected in 1973
1973 Northern Ireland Assembly election

References

External links
Conflict Archive - University of Ulster

 
Government of Northern Ireland
The Troubles (Northern Ireland)
1973 establishments in Northern Ireland
1974 disestablishments in Northern Ireland